Dyseuaresta tenuis is a species of tephritid or fruit flies in the genus Dyseuaresta of the family Tephritidae.

Distribution
Brazil.

References

Tephritinae
Insects described in 1873
Diptera of South America